This is a list of all United States Supreme Court cases from volume 406 of the United States Reports:

External links

1972 in United States case law